A list of adventure films released in the 1990s.

1990

1991

1992

1993

1994

1995

1996

1997

1998

1999

Notes

1990s adventure films
1990s
Adventure